Belews Creek Township is one of fifteen townships in Forsyth County, North Carolina, United States. The township had a population of 2,647 according to the 2010 census.

Geographically, Belews Creek Township occupies  in central Forsyth County.  There are no incorporated municipalities in Belews Creek Township however, the small unincorporated community of Belews Creek is located here.

References

Townships in Forsyth County, North Carolina
Townships in North Carolina